Apalachicola may refer to:

 Apalachicola band, an association of Native American towns along the Apalachicola River in Florida in the early 19th century
 Apalachicola Province, an association of Native American towns on the Chattahoochee River in Alabama and Georgia that became the Lower Towns of the Muscogee Confederacy
 Apalachicola (tribal town), a Native American town that was the namesake of the Apalachicola Province

Places
Apalachicola, Florida
Apalachicola River
Apalachicola Bay
Apalachicola National Forest
Apalachicola Regional Airport
Port of Apalachicola

Railroad
Apalachicola and Alabama Railroad
Apalachicola Northern Railroad

Ships
, a tugboat in the United States Navy.